Gary Brooks (born 8 May 1983 in Kingston) is a Jamaican soccer player.

Career

Professional
Brooks began his professional career in 2002 with the USL First Division with the Virginia Beach Mariners, and went on to play for the Atlanta Silverbacks and the Vancouver Whitecaps before to signing for Crystal Palace Baltimore prior to their inaugural 2007 season.

In his first season in Baltimore he was named in the USL Second Division All-League First-Team for scoring seven goals in nine games and also recording two assists, while in his second season he was named in the USL Second Division All-League Second-Team.

He signed for the Real Maryland Monarchs in 2009, and moved to Crystal Palace Baltimore in 2010.

Indoor Soccer
Brooks also has extensive professional indoor soccer experience, having made his indoor soccer debut with the then Major Indoor Soccer League's (MISL) Philadelphia Kixx in 2004. He signed with the California Cougars in 2006 before competing in the former MISL with the New Jersey Ironmen for the 2007 and 2008 seasons. Most recently, he played in the National Indoor Soccer League for Rockford Rampage.

Career statistics
(correct as of 2 October 2010)

References

External links
Real Maryland Monarchs bio

1983 births
Living people
Atlanta Silverbacks players
California Cougars players
Crystal Palace Baltimore players
Expatriate soccer players in Canada
Expatriate soccer players in the United States
Association football forwards
Jamaican expatriate footballers
Jamaican expatriate sportspeople in Canada
Jamaican expatriate sportspeople in the United States
Jamaican footballers
Major Indoor Soccer League (2001–2008) players
New Jersey Ironmen (MISL) players
Sportspeople from Kingston, Jamaica
Philadelphia KiXX (2001–2008 MISL) players
A-League (1995–2004) players
USL First Division players
USL Second Division players
USSF Division 2 Professional League players
Vancouver Whitecaps (1986–2010) players
Virginia Beach Mariners players
Real Maryland F.C. players